The 2012–13 Illinois Piasa season was the seventh season of the Illinois Piasa indoor soccer club and third as a franchise in the Professional Arena Soccer League. The Piasa, named for the Piasa Bird of Native American legend, are an Eastern Division team who played their home games in The Sports Academy in Glen Carbon, Illinois. The team was led by owner Jim Williams and head coach Jason Norsic.

Season summary
The team struggled in the regular season, compiling a 4–12 record. They placed fourth in the five-team Eastern Division and failed to advance to the postseason. The team fared better at home than on the road with all four of their wins coming on home turf. Two of the Piasa's four wins came against the Ohio Vortex but Illinois also provided Ohio with its only win of the season.

The Piasa participated in the 2012–13 United States Open Cup for Arena Soccer. They received a bye in the Wild Card round then lost to the Chicago Mustangs in the Round of 16, ending their tournament run.

Off-field moves
For the 2012–13 season, the team named former goalkeeper Jason Norsic as head coach. He replaced both Joe Reiniger and Justin McMillian who had previously shared coaching duties. Norsic played college soccer at Southwestern Illinois College and McKendree University before playing professionally for the St. Louis Steamers, Swanner United FC, St. Louis Illusion, Piasa FC, and Illinois Piasa.

The team's official sportswear for the 2012–13 season was supplied by Admiral Sportswear, the world's oldest soccer brand.

The Piasa's dance team for the 2012-13 season, the Piasa Pizazz Pro Dance Team, was led by Danielle Lusicic-Wise.

At the November 9, 2012, home game, the team organized a canned food drive for a food bank in the St. Louis, Missouri, area. Fans received a discount on tickets when they presented a canned food donation at the box office.

Awards and honors
On December 11, 2012, the Professional Arena Soccer League named rookie goalkeeper Alan Hagerty as the Player of the Week. The league cited his 32 saves and second-half shutout of rival Rockford Rampage on December 3, leading the Piasa to their first win of the season.

Schedule

Regular season

† Game also counts for US Open Cup, as listed in chart below.

2012–13 US Open Cup for Arena Soccer

References

External links
Illinois Piasa official website
The Sports Academy official website

Illinois Piasa seasons
Illinois Piasa
Illinois Piasa
Illinois Piasa